The Shot at Dawn Memorial is a monument at the National Memorial Arboretum near Alrewas, in Staffordshire, UK. It commemorates the 306 British Army and Commonwealth soldiers executed after courts-martial for desertion and other capital offences during World War I.

Background
The memorial is to servicemen executed by firing squad during the First World War.
It has been argued that soldiers accused of cowardice were often not given fair trials; they were often not properly defended, and some were minors. Other sources contend that military law, being based on Roman rather than Common law, appears unfamiliar to civilian eyes but is no less fair. It was the court's role to establish facts, for example, not for prosecutors and defenders to argue their cases; and Holmes states "it was the first duty of the court to ensure the prisoner had every advantage to what he was legally entitled". Defendants often chose to speak in their own defence. The usual cause for their offences has been re-attributed in modern times to post-traumatic stress syndrome and combat stress reaction. 
Another perspective is that the decisions to execute were taken in the heat of war when the commander's job was to keep the army together and fighting.

Of the 200,000 or so men court-martialed during the First World War, 20,000 were found guilty of offences carrying the death penalty. Of those, 3080 actually received it, and of those sentences, 346 were carried out.

The others were given lesser sentences, or had death sentences commuted to a lesser punishment, e.g. hard labour, field punishment or a suspended sentence. 91 of the men executed were under a suspended sentence: 41 of those executed were previously subject to commuted death sentences, and one had a death sentence commuted twice before. Of the 346 men who were executed, 309 were pardoned: the remaining 37 were executed for murder, and would have been executed under civilian law.

The families of these victims often carried the stigma of the label of "coward". Another side to this form of justice is the lasting emotional pain caused to those who were in the firing squads, shooting those found guilty.

Britain was one of the last countries to withhold pardons for men executed during World War I: in 1993, John Major argued in the House of Commons that pardoning the men would be an insult to those who died honourably on the battlefield and that everyone was tried fairly.

However, in August 2006 the then Defence Secretary, Des Browne, reversed this decision. In 2007, the Armed Forces Act 2006 was passed allowing the soldiers to be pardoned posthumously, although section 359(4) of the act states that the pardon "does not affect any conviction or sentence."

Memorial
The memorial was created by the British public artist Andy DeComyn. It was created in 2000 as a gift from the artist to the relatives and was unveiled at the National Memorial Arboretum by Gertrude Harris, daughter of Private Harry Farr, in June 2001. Marina Brewis, the great-niece of Lance Corporal Peter Goggins, also attended the service.

The memorial portrays a young British soldier blindfolded and tied to a stake, ready to be shot by a firing squad. The memorial was modelled on the likeness of 17-year-old Private Herbert Burden, who lied about his age to enlist in the armed forces and was later shot for desertion.

It is surrounded by a semicircle of stakes, on each of which are listed the names of the soldiers executed in this fashion.

Tables
By nationality

By theatre of war

By charge

See also
 List of books on military executions in World War I
 Pardon for Soldiers of the Great War Act 2000

References

Sources
Corrigan, Gordon: Mud, Blood and Poppycock (2003)  
Holmes, Richard: Tommy (2004)

Further reading
 Entry in UK National Inventory of War Memorials
 Johnson, David. Executed at Dawn: The British Firing Squads of the First World War. History Press, 2015. 
 "Tribute to WWI 'Cowards'", BBC News. 21 June 2001.
 Worth, Robert F. "What if PTSD Is More Physical than Psychological?" The New York Times. 12 June 2016.

External links

Memorial to German World War II deserters in Ulm, Germany at the Sites of Memory webpage
Memorial to all deserters in Stuttgart, Germany at the Sites of Memory webpage
List of cemeteries and memorials containing burials of men executed under the Army Act during the Great War
 List of men executed at webmatters.net
 Comments made later in interview by members of the firing squads

2001 establishments in England
2001 sculptures
 
Buildings and structures completed in 2001
Capital punishment in the United Kingdom
Concrete sculptures in England
Military discipline and World War I
National Memorial Arboretum
Sculptures of men in the United Kingdom
World War I memorials in the United Kingdom